The 1938 Allan Cup was the Canadian senior ice hockey championship for the 1937–38 season.

Final 
Best of 5
Trail 6 Cornwall 4
Trail 8 Cornwall 2
Cornwall 2 Trail 1
Trail 5 Cornwall 1

Trail Smoke Eaters beat Cornwall Flyers 3-1 on series.

External links
Allan Cup archives 
Allan Cup website

 
Allan Cup
Allan